Vanayi-ye Sofla (also Romanized as Vanāyī-ye Soflá; also known as Vanābī-ye Soflá) is a village in Koregah-e Sharqi Rural District, in the Central District of Khorramabad County, Lorestan Province, Iran. At the 2006 census, its population was 24, in 6 families.

References 

Towns and villages in Khorramabad County